Paraplatyptilia sahlbergi is a moth of the family Pterophoridae that is found in Russia (the South Siberian Mountains) and China.

The forewings are greyish-white and the hindwings are grey.

References

Moths described in 1906
sahlbergi